Mathias Boe (born 11 July 1980) is a badminton player from Denmark. He was the gold medalist at the 2015 European Games, two time European champions winning in 2012 and 2017, and the silver medalist at the 2012 Summer Olympics. He joined the Denmark winning team at the 2016 Thomas Cup in Kunshan, China.

Career 
He won the silver medal at the 2006 European Championships in men's doubles with Carsten Mogensen.

In 2010, Mogensen and Boe won the titles at the Denmark and French Opens and also the Superseries Final held in Taipei. One year later Mogensen and Boe won the All England Open.

With Mogensen, he won the silver medal in the men's doubles at the 2012 Olympics. He took the silver medal with Mogensen in the 2013 World Championships while losing to Muhammad Ahsan and Hendra Setiawan in the final.

Boe announced in February 2020, that the Thomas Cup or Olympic Games would be his last tournament, but in April 2020, he decided to retire as professional badminton player at the age of 39. He revealed that, mentally, he is lately simply too exhausted both in training and competition.

He is currently the men's doubles coach for the India national badminton team.

Achievements

Olympic Games 
Men's doubles

World Championships 
Men's doubles

European Games 
Men's doubles

European Championships 
Men's doubles

European Junior Championships 
Boys' doubles

Mixed doubles

BWF World Tour 
The BWF World Tour, which was announced on 19 March 2017 and implemented in 2018, is a series of elite badminton tournaments sanctioned by the Badminton World Federation (BWF). The BWF World Tour is divided into levels of World Tour Finals, Super 1000, Super 750, Super 500, Super 300, and the BWF Tour Super 100.

Men's doubles

BWF Superseries 
The BWF Superseries, launched on 14 December 2006 and implemented in 2007, is a series of elite badminton tournaments, sanctioned by Badminton World Federation (BWF). BWF Superseries has two levels: Superseries and Superseries Premier. A season of Superseries features twelve tournaments around the world, which introduced since 2011, with successful players invited to the Superseries Finals held at the year end.

Men's doubles

  BWF Superseries Finals tournament
  BWF Superseries Premier tournament
  BWF Superseries tournament

BWF Grand Prix 

The BWF Grand Prix has two levels, Grand Prix and Grand Prix Gold. It is a series of badminton tournaments sanctioned by the Badminton World Federation (BWF) since 2007. The World Badminton Grand Prix sanctioned by International Badminton Federation (IBF) since 1983.

Men's doubles

Mixed doubles

  BWF Grand Prix Gold tournament
  BWF & IBF Grand Prix tournament

BWF International Challenge/Series/European Circuit 
Men's doubles

Mixed doubles

  BWF International Challenge tournament
  BWF International Series / European Circuit tournament

References

External links 

 
 
  (together with Mogensen)
 
 
 Mathias Boe at Badminton.dk
 
 

1980 births
Living people
People from Frederikssund Municipality
Danish male badminton players
Badminton players at the 2012 Summer Olympics
Badminton players at the 2016 Summer Olympics
Olympic badminton players of Denmark
Olympic silver medalists for Denmark
Olympic medalists in badminton
Medalists at the 2012 Summer Olympics
Badminton players at the 2015 European Games
European Games gold medalists for Denmark
European Games medalists in badminton
World No. 1 badminton players
Sportspeople from the Capital Region of Denmark
Danish expatriate sportspeople in India